North Province was an electoral province of the Legislative Council of Western Australia between 1894 and 1989. It elected three members between 1894 and 1965 and two members between 1965 and 1989.

Members

References
 David Black (2014), The Western Australian Parliamentary Handbook (Twenty-Third Edition), pp. 221–222, 226

Former electoral provinces of Western Australia
1900 establishments in Australia
1989 disestablishments in Australia